Aya (rarely Nin-Aya) was an Akkadian goddess of dawn, and the wife of Shamash, the sun god. Her Sumerian equivalent was Sherida, wife of Shamash's equivalent Utu.

Character 
Aya's name means dawn in Akkadian. She was associated with morning light and the rising sun. In this role she was called "morning-maker." It has also been suggested that the Sumerian name Sherida was a loan from Akkadian šērtum, "morning." Gebhard Selz notes that this would make her one of the first deities whose name has Akkadian origin to be integrated into the pantheons of Sumerian-speaking areas. Other such examples are Suen, a name of the moon god, and Ishtaran, a divine judge. Further attested names of the sun god's wife include Ninkar, Sudaĝ and Sudgan.

Her another primary function was that of a divine bride, as exemplified by her epithet kallatum ("bride," "daughter in law"). As Shamash's wife she was regarded as epitome of beauty and charm. Shamash and Aya are the divine couple most often invoked together in seal inscriptions from Sippar, followed by Adad and Shala and Enki and Damkina. Aya was also commonly invoked to intercede with her husband on behalf of human devotees. This function is also well attested for other divine spouses, such as Ninmug and Shala. It has also been pointed out that in the case of Inanna, her sukkal Ninshubur fulfilled a similar role.

In art Aya was commonly depicted frontally. Many depictions highlighted her beauty and sexual charm. On seals from Sippar she was often depicted wearing a type of garment which exposed her right breast, meant to emphasize her qualities as a charming and attractive bride. Ishtar and Annunitum (who in Sippar functioned as a separate goddess, rather than an epithet) were depicted similarly.  The existence of an emblem representing Aya is mentioned in texts from Sippar, but no detailed descriptions of it are known.

Association with other deities 
Aya was regarded as the wife of Shamash, and thus the daughter-in-law of his parents Suen and Ningal and sister-in-law of Ishtar. Their daughters were Mamu (or Mamud), the goddess of dreams and Kittum ("truth"). According to Joan Goodnick Westenholz another child of the sun god and his wife was Ishum. However, due to confusion between Sudaĝ (a title of Aya, "golden glow") and Sud (the tutelary goddess of Shuruppak, equated with Ninlil) the latter appears in the role Ishum's mother in a single myth. Manfred Krebernik assumes that Sud and Sudaĝ were only confused with each other rather than conflated or syncretised.

A single god list dated to the Middle Babylonian period or later equates Lahar with Aya and explains that the former should be understood as "Aya as the goddess of caring for things," da-a šá ku-né-e. This equation is regarded as unusual, as Lahar was consistently regarded as male otherwise, and the evidence for connections between both goddesses and mortal women with herding sheep, a sphere of life Lahar was associated with, is limited.

Hurrian reception
Outside Mesopotamia Aya was incorporated into Hurrian religion under the name "Ayu-Ikalti," derived from the phrase Aya kallatu. In Hurrian sources she was also viewed as the spouse of a sun god, Šimige. She is one of the Hurrian deities depicted in the Yazılıkaya sanctuary, where a relief of her can be seen in a procession of goddesses, between Nikkal and a figure who might represent Shaushka.

A trilingual Sumero-Hurro-Ugaritic edition of the Weidner god list from Ugarit attests the equivalence between Shamash (Utu), Šimige and the local sun goddess Shapash (Šapšu). Apparently to avoid the implications that Shapash had a wife, the scribes interpreted the name of Aya, present in the Sumerian original, as an unconventional writing of Ea. Instead of the Hurrian spelling of Aya, the name Eyan corresponds to him in the Hurrian column and Ugaritic one lists the local craftsman god Kothar-wa-Khasis.

Worship 
While Aya is overall less well attested in textual records than major goddesses such as Ishtar, Nanaya, Ninlil or Ninisina, it is nonetheless assumed that she was a popular target of personal devotion, as she appears commonly in personal names and on seals. She was worshiped already in the Early Dynastic period, and appears in texts from Ur, as well as in the Abu Salabikh and Fara god lists. The name Sherida is already attested in theophoric names from Lagash from the same period, such as Ur-Sherida. In the Old Babylonian period Aya was one of the most popular goddesses, with only Ishtar appearing more often in sources such as personal letters. 
Ebabbar (Sumerian: "Shining white house"), Shamash's temple in Sippar, was the primary center of Aya's cult as well. In legal documents from that city, she often appears as a divine witness, alongside her husband, their daughter Mamu and Shamash's sukkal Bunene, the latter two also regarded as a couple. Manishtushu dedicated a mace head to "Nin-Aya" in Sippar. Samsu-iluna, one of the Old Babylonian kings, called himself "beloved of Shamash and Aya" and both renovated the Ebabbar and built walls around Sippar.

Naditu priestesses from Sippar were particularly closely associated with Aya: they addressed her as their mistress, commonly took theophoric names invoking her, and exclusively swore oaths by her. They were a class of women closely associated with Shamash. Their existence is particularly well attested in the Old Babylonian period, and it has been argued that the institution first developed around 1880 BCE, during the reign of Sumu-la-El of Babylon. Naditu lived in a building referred to as gagûm, conventionally translated as "cloister," and Tonia Sharlach notes they can be compared to medieval Christian nuns. They are sometimes described as "priestesses" in modern literature, but while it is well attested that they were considered to be dedicated to a specific deity, there is little evidence for their involvement in religious activities other than personal prayer. It is not impossible they were understood as a fully separate social class. Family background of individual naditu varied, though they came predominantly from the higher strata of society. While many came from families of craftsmen, scribes or military officials, a number of them were daughters or sisters of kings. Both Zimri-Lim of Mari and Hammurabi of Babylon had naditu of Shamash among their female family members. 

It has been argued Aya was less prominent in the other city associated with Shamash, Larsa, where she doesn't appear in official lists of offerings. It is assumed that the Ebabbar in this city was nonetheless regarded as dedicated to her alongside Shamash. Some references are also present in texts from the Neo-Babylonian period, with one text mentioning the priests from Larsa sent jewelry of Aya and of the "divine daughter of Ebabbar" to Uruk for repairs. References to a "treasury of Shamash and Aya" are known too. Paul-Alain Beaulieu additionally proposes that a goddess only known by the epithet Belet Larsa ("Lady of Larsa"), who appears in Neo-Babylonian letters, might be Aya. 

A sanctuary dedicated to Aya, Eidubba ("house of storage bins") also existed in Assur.  A further house of worship dedicated to her, mentioned in the Canonical Temple List, was known as Edimgalanna ("house, great bond of heaven"), but its location is unknown. In Seleucid Uruk, she was among the goddesses celebrated during the New Year festival. 

Aya was also worshiped outside Mesopotamia in Mari. She appears in theophoric names of women from this city with comparable frequency to her husband Shamash and Dagan, the head god of inland Syria, though less commonly than Annu, Ishtar, Ishara, Kakka (regarded as a goddess in this city), Mamma and Admu. Examples include Aya-lamassi, Aya-ummi and Yatara-Aya.

Uncertain attestations
Manfred Krebernik assumes that in texts from Ebla, the name Ninkar refers to the spouse of a sun deity, who he assumed was seen as male in this city. Alfonso Archi instead concludes that the deity was primarily female based on lexical evidence. Joan Goodnick Westenholz proposed that Ninkar in Eblaite texts should be interpreted as Ninkarrak rather than the phonetically similar but more obscure Mesopotamian Ninkar. Occasional shortening of Ninkarrak's name to "Ninkar" is known from Mesopotamian sources as well. The identification of Eblaite Ninkar with Ninkarrak is also accepted by Archi.

Mythology 
Buduhudug, a mythical mountain where the sun was believed to set, was regarded as "the entrance of Shamash to Aya" (nēreb dŠamaš <ana> dAya) - the place where they were able to reunite each day after Shamash finished his journey through the sky.

In the "Standard Babylonian" version of the Epic of Gilgamesh, Ninsun during her prayer to Shamash asks Aya three times to intercede on behalf of her son Gilgamesh to guarantee his safety both during the day and the night. Ninsun states that the optimal time for Aya to appeal to her husband is right after sunset, when he returns home from his daily journey.

References

Bibliography 

Mesopotamian goddesses
Dawn
Solar goddesses
Hurrian deities
Dawn goddesses